Alan Daniel Maman (born October 25, 1977), professionally known as the Alchemist (or simply Alchemist), is an American record producer, DJ, rapper and songwriter. He began his music career in 1991 in the hip hop duo The Whooliganz under the moniker Mudfoot, along with now-actor Scott Caan (whose moniker was "Mad Skillz"). He has produced music since the 1990s.

Together with his longtime collaborator Oh No (with whom he forms the group Gangrene), Woody Jackson and Tangerine Dream, he composed the official score to the 2013 video game Grand Theft Auto V and hosts radio station The Lab in it.

Career

Maman hails from Beverly Hills, California. As a teenager, he began to identify strongly with the rebellious lyrics and urban sounds of hip-hop, and he began writing his own lyrics. He joined up with other like-minded artists who wrote lyrics and rebelled against their suburban surroundings. These included Shifty Shellshock of Crazy Town, Evidence and Scott Caan, son of James Caan. In 1991, a 14-year-old Maman and Scott Caan decided to become a duo named The Whooliganz. While rhyming at a party in L.A., they attracted the attention of B-Real of Cypress Hill. He invited the teens to join his crew, The Soul Assassins, which also included the groups House of Pain and Funkdoobiest. In 1993, the Whooliganz released their first single, "Put Your Handz Up." The song received little radio airplay and their record label, Tommy Boy Records, decided to shelve their album. Rejected, Scott focused his creative energy on acting while Al became interested in process of making hip-hop beats.

DJ Muggs took Al under his wing and taught him how to use a sampler and mixing board. After helping to produce a few tracks for Cypress Hill, Al became the main producer for his childhood friend Evidence and his group Dilated Peoples.

When Dilated Peoples debuted in 1998, it helped promote Maman as a key part of its sound. Alchemist also produced several tracks on Defari's debut album Focused Daily, another Dilated and Alkaholik affiliate. In 1999, Muggs introduced Al to his good friends the popular hip-hop group Mobb Deep. Al produced two songs for its Murda Muzik album. Impressed by his production skills and street smarts, Mobb Deep continued using his beats on all of the group's subsequent albums. As Alchemist's profile increased, he went on to produce for many of hip hop's most successful and prominent artists, such as Nas, Fat Joe, Jadakiss, Ghostface Killah, and Snoop Dogg. He has also remixed songs for bands and artists in other genres such as Linkin Park and Morcheeba. Al stayed loyal to his old friends, continuing to produce for Dilated, Cypress Hill and Crazy Town. He also enjoys producing for lesser-known underground rappers, often giving them some of his best beats.

In 2004, six years after his rapping career folded, The Alchemist put out his debut album, 1st Infantry. The album yielded the single "Hold You Down" (featuring Prodigy, Illa Ghee and Nina Sky), which hit number ninety-five on the Billboard Hot 100 in 2005.

Feud with Ras Kass
In 1999, The Alchemist was set to produce three tracks for American rapper Ras Kass' then-upcoming album Van Gogh, which was scheduled for a late 2000 release at the time. One of the said tracks was "Home Sweet Home", which was to be the lead single for Ras Kass' album. After The Alchemist received the first half of the payment for the beat, he said Ras Kass' record label (Priority) was ignoring him. They later met up in August, at the Source Awards in Pasadena, California, where Alchemist informed Kass that he'd been showcasing the beat to other artists. Jadakiss would then go on to record "We Gonna Make It" over the same beat, on his 2001 release, Kiss Tha Game Goodbye. When Ras Kass took notice, he attempted to stop the release by releasing his version of the song on mixtapes, to no avail. This prompted Ras to diss Alchemist in freestyles and on a track from Van Gogh. Eventually, the beef ended so he could concentrate on his legal problems but still cited a loss of respect for the producer. In an interview with www.hiphopgame.com, Ras admitted that he was being stubborn and refused to listen to what the Alchemist was trying to tell him. The two have since squashed the beef and Alchemist produced the song "Past, Future, and Present" and did the intro for the song that appeared on the 2006 mixtape Revenge of the Spit. In 2011, Ras Kass appeared (together with rapper Raekwon) on fellow rapper Evidence's album Cats & Dogs, on a song called "The Red Carpet", which was produced by The Alchemist.

Other projects
The Alchemist is one of the music producers behind the video game Grand Theft Auto: Chinatown Wars released by Rockstar Games. He was also on Tim Westwood TV, when Eminem, Royce Da 5'9" and Mr. Porter freestyled. During an interview with Worldwide Conspiracy Radio, The Alchemist revealed he would be dropping a 2-part project with fellow West Coast producer Oh No entitled Gangrene, the first to be released in July, the second in November, both on Decon. Alchemist was also the DJ for the Eminem set on the BBC1 chat-show Jonathan Ross on June 4, 2010.

Shady Records
Alchemist is Eminem's official DJ, since DJ Green Lantern departed from Shady Records in 2005 because of a dispute related to the feud of 50 Cent and Jadakiss. In 2006, Eminem released a collaboration album with Shady Records called Eminem Presents: The Re-Up. Since the Alchemist is his official DJ, he produced some of the tracks on the mixtape, as well as compiling the album in a mixtape fashion. On December 18, 2013, he was named the runner-up for Producer of the Year by HipHopDX.

Collaboration projects
"Return of the Mac" (2007)
In 2007, the Alchemist and rapper Prodigy came together for a studio album titled Return of the Mac, that was released on March 27, 2007. The album features songs sampled from the Blaxploitation era.

Return of the Mac debuted at number thirty-two on the Billboard 200, selling 27,000 copies in its first week. As of December 2007, the album has sold 130,000 copies. Return of the Mac was supported by three singles with music videos: "Mac 10 Handle", "New York Shit", and "Stuck on You".

"The Antidote" (2009)
In 2009, The Alchemist produced an entire mixtape with rapper Fashawn, called The Antidote.

"Covert Coup" (2011)
The Alchemist and the rapper Curren$y came together for the mixtape Covert Coup, which was released April 20, 2011.

"No Idols" (2012)
In August 2013, The Alchemist produced Odd Future member Domo Genesis' mixtape, No Idols. It was later released on a limited edition vinyl.

"Yacht Rock" (2012)
On October 31, 2012, The Alchemist released a free download from 9Five's website that was later released on vinyl.

 "Rare Chandeliers" (2012)
Rare Chandeliers, a collaboration between Alchemist and Action Bronson, was released on November 15, 2012, as a mixtape.

 "360 Waves" (2013)
The Alchemist was a producer and featured artist on Durag Dynasty's album 360 Waves.

 "Albert Einstein" (2013)
Prodigy's second album with the Alchemist, Albert Einstein, was released on June 11, 2013. It debuted at number 175 on the Billboard 200 chart, with first-week sales of 3,000 copies in the United States. The following week it fell off the chart.

"Masterpiece Theatre EP" (2013)
The Alchemist produced the Willie the Kid EP "Masterpiece Theater EP", which was released on July 23, 2013.

 "My 1st Chemistry Set" (2013)
Detroit Rapper Boldy James signed a record deal with Decon for an Alchemist-produced album; My 1st Chemistry Set was released on October 15, 2013.

 Gangrene

On the album Chemical Warfare he and rapper Oh No performed as "Gangrene" on two songs, "Act of Violence" and "Under Siege". As Gangrene they subsequently released the Sawblade EP and the studio album Gutter Water in 2010, the Greneberg EP in 2011, and an album Vodka & Ayahuasca and an EP Odditorium EP in 2012. Gangrene, along with Tangerine Dream and Woody Jackson, contributed music for the 2013 video game Grand Theft Auto V.

 "Lord Steppington" (Step Brothers) (2014)
The Alchemist and fellow rapper Evidence have performed as the duo Step Brothers. Their debut album was announced to be titled Lord Steppington and released on the Rhymesayers Entertainment label. Talking about the album in 2010, Alchemist said, "I wanna create a sound for it. I don't want Step Brothers songs to sound like it could've been a Dilated Peoples song, or an Evidence song, that I'd rap on." A release date for the album was scheduled for November 19, 2013, but later the release date was pushed to January 20, 2014. There is also an Instrumental version for the album, that was released on Vinyl.

 "The Good Book" (Gospel Project with Budgie) (2014)
In an interview for Dead End Hip-Hop, Alchemist stated that he had been working on a project related to the gospel. Later, on March 2, 2014, he posted a teaser photo to that project, which will be a collaboration between Alchemist and producer Budgie, and also retweeted a tweet from Frank The Butcher (the founder of BAU, which the project is going to be released on) announcing the project and saying that more information will be released two days after.

Later, on March 5, they announced that the project is named "The Good Book", and released the first single "In Heaven's Home", feat. Roc Marciano and Prodigy. It will come in a well-designed cover in a shape of a bible book, covered in leather, and will be limited to 1000. It will be released on March 11. The project will include mostly instrumentals and also some raps featuring Prodigy, Roc Marciano, Action Bronson, Blu, A$ton Mathews, Domo Genesis, Mick Luter, and J. Rocc. All Gospel samples.

 "British Knights – Which Ways The Beach Mix" (2014)
On September 10, 2014, Alchemist spontaneously wrote on Twitter that producer Samiyam and himself has something to release with Dr. Romanelli (that Al previously did something for earlier, the Diagnosis mix with Coca-Cola). Later he published a new 8-minute mix of beats by himself and beats by Samiyam for the shoe brand British Knights. The mix has an Action Bronson verse (on an Alchemist beat) in it too.

 FASH-ionably Late (2014)
Completely by surprise, on December 8, 2014, Alchemist tweeted that he and rapper Fashawn are going to release an EP together soon, and gave a link to the first video/single from the album, "Dreams" (featuring Evidence). Fashawn tweeted that the reason for this EP is that sample clearances on his upcoming album, The Ecology, were taking too long, and he wanted the fans to have some music to listen too in the meanwhile. He also said that working with Alchemist is always a unique, special and different vibe and experience. The EP was set to contain 7 tracks, all produced by Alchemist and to be released on December 18, for Free. On the day of the release, a second video was released, for the song "Never Waiting In Vain" (last song on the EP).

 Welcome to Los Santos (Gangrene)
On March 6, 2015, a while after Rockstar Games announced the release of the PC GTA V, it was announced that Alchemist and Oh No (Gangrene) will have a new radio station called The Lab in the game. In addition to that, a new song "Play It Cool" (feat. Earl Sweatshirt and Samuel Herring) was released. The song is apart from a new album of tracks inspired by GTA V named Welcome to Los Santos that was released on April 21, 2015. The album is a compilation album of new songs from a wide range of artists. The Alchemist and Oh No were involved in the production of the songs, and the album was released for the release of the PC version of the game.

 You Disgust Me (Gangrene)
On Twitter, Oh No mentioned that the third project by Gangrene (the collaboration of Alchemist and Oh No) is in the making. Following the release of the Grand Theft Auto V score produced by Alchemist and Oh No, they revealed that their focus was now on a new Gangrene album. In an exclusive interview in the show "Jigga Juice" in an Israeli radio station (106.2FM) on June 25, 2014, The Alchemist said that the album is almost finalized.
On November 7, 2014, Alchemist tweeted again about new Gangrene coming soon and then, Director Jason Goldwatch announced that they are making songs and videos (more specifically, "songs for videos, instead of the other way around"). On January 14, 2015, Goldwatch said that the editing of the first video, for a single named "Driving Gloves" is done, and the video is coming soon. The video was released on July 17. Gangrene revealed the album title to be "You Disgust Me".
The album was first released on iTunes, on August 7, 2015, and then on a physical copy a week or so later.

 Craft Singles
On November 18, Alchemist released a single on his SoundCloud, featuring Mac Miller and Migos, titled "Jabroni". Later he said on Twitter that it will be released on limited 45 vinyl single with an instrumental version, as part of a new single series, called Craft Singles.
On February 11, Alchemist announced the dates of release of every one of the 4 Craft Singles Vinyls. The tracks were: "Hoover Street (Original Version)" by Schoolboy Q (March 11, 2016), "Any Means" and "Supply" by MC Eiht & Spice One (April 8), "Cobb" and "Palisades" by Blu (May 6) and "Jabroni" by Migos and Mac Miller (June 3). Some of those were already released online and Alchemist released the "Hoover Street Original Version" online on the same day of the announcements. On August 11, another song was released: "All for It" by Roc Marciano.

 The Carrollton Heist
On January 13, 2016, The Alchemist and Curren$y announced their second collaboration on Twitter, entitled "The Carrollton Heist". The album was all recorded in one day, January 4, 2016 (Monday). Later, Curren$y announced a release date (and cover art) on his Instagram. The release date was set to February 14, 2016. This second collaboration of Alchemist and Curren$y was very long-awaited since rumors of a Covert Coup sequel (their first collab) were floating online back in 2012 until Alchemist dismissed them in an interview. The album was, indeed released on February 14, On DatPiff. Later, Alchemist noticed that the version there was not the final mastered one, so he uploaded the full mastered version to his SoundCloud page.

 Rap and Glorie EP
On March 17, 2016, it was announced that Alchemist and Dutch rapper Kempi will be releasing an EP on April 2, 2016. The EP consists of 4 tracks and 4 instrumental versions of them. On March 25, 2016, a mini-documentary video was uploaded, showing the making of the EP.

 The Silent Partner
On March 2, 2016, Havoc posted a photo on his Instagram stating that his next album is produced by Alchemist, and is coming soon.  The title was revealed to be "The Silent Partner" and the first single, "Maintain", was released later. The album was released on May 20.

 Fantasy Island EP
In December 2016, mixer Eddie Sancho revealed that he's mixing a joint project by Alchemist and rapper Jay Worthy. Much later, in April 2017, The Alchemist revealed the name and June 2 release date of the project, titled "Fantasy Island EP".

 The Good Book, Vol. 2
The Alchemist teased the sequel to The Good Book project (with producer Budgie) on his Instagram Story a couple of times. Then, on May 7, 2017, he surprisingly tweeted a link to pre-order the project and a first single, "Brother Jedediah", featuring Action Bronson and Big Body Bess. The project was released on July 21. Like the previous Good Book, it contains two parts (one by Alchemist and one by Busgie). Alchemist's part features lyrics from Mobb Deep, Westside Gunn, Conway, Royce da 5'9", Durag Dynasty, Action Bronson and more, as well as beats and some audio collages.

 Paris, LA, Bruxelles
In September 2017, a Hip-Hop project was released by Red Bull France. The project consists of 8 tracks by rappers from Paris and Bruxelles (Belgium), with Alchemist helming the entire production of the project.

Fetti

A collaboration between Alchemist, Currensy and Freddie Gibbs. Fetti was first announced on January 4, 2017, through an Instagram post by Currensy.

On September 21, 2018, nearly 2 years later, Currensy announced on Instagram that he had completed his half of the project. In the post, Currensy is recorded saying, "This message is to one Fredrick Gibbs. My half of Fetti is done. All produced by Alchemist." Gibbs would publicly respond to the post shortly after, commenting "N***a. Send It. I'm by the booth." On October 25, the tracklist and release date were posted by Gibbs on Instagram. In an interview with The Grinds TV, Gibbs stated that his half of the EP took two days to complete.

Lamb Over Rice
In November 2019, Alchemist and Action Bronson announced that a new special edition vinyl of Rare Chandeliers is coming soon, along with a brand new collaboration EP - Lamb Over Rice. The EP was released on November 22 and it contains 7 tracks. 5 of them are brand new, but it also contains 2 previously released singles: "Descendant to the Stars" (that was released on 2016 for Action Bronson's Antient Aliens show) and "Just the Way It Is" that was a part of Alchemist's Coca-Cola mix "Diagnosis" from 2013 (sampling a Coca-Cola commercial).

Boldface EP

As Alchemist final project of the 2010s decade, on December 20, 2019, The Alchemist and Boldy James released their second collaborative project after 2013's My 1st Chemistry Set. It consists of 5 tracks, all produced by Alchemist. Prior to the release, a joint video for Ill Advised and Method to my Madness was released.

LULU

A collaboration between Conway The Machine and The Alchemist, Lulu was released on March 30, 2020.

A Doctor, Painter & an Alchemist Walk into a Bar

On October 3, 2020, Alchemist released the album, A Doctor, Painter & an Alchemist Walk into a Bar.

Personal life
The Alchemist was born Alan Maman in Beverly Hills, California. He is Jewish and his father is a businessman.

On July 13, 2005, the tour bus carrying Eminem's entourage (including rapper Stat Quo as well as Alchemist) swerved off the road and turned over. Alchemist was treated for broken ribs and a collapsed lung.

Discography

Studio albums
 1st Infantry (2004)
 Chemical Warfare (2009)
 Russian Roulette (2012)
 The Alchemist Sandwich (2022)

Extended plays and other media
 The Alchemist's Cookbook (2008)
 Yacht Rock (2012)
 SSUR (2013)
 Diagnosis (2013)
 Nothing to See/Hear  (with Evidence) (2014) 
 British Knights – Which Way's The Beach  (with Samiyam) (2014)
 Craft Singles (2016–2020)
 Lunch Meat (2018)
 Bread (2018)
 Yacht Rock 2 (2019)
 This Thing of Ours (2021)
 This Thing of Ours 2 (2021)
 Cycles (Original Score) (2021)

Mixtapes
 The Cutting Room Floor (2003)
 Insomnia (2003)
 No Days Off (2006)
 The Chemistry Files (2006)
 The Cutting Room Floor 2 (2008)
 The Cutting Room Floor 3 (2013)

Instrumentals
 Gangster Theme Music (2000)
 Action/Drama (2001)
 The Ultimate Music Machine (2002)
 Lab Tested, Street Approved (2004)
 1st Infantry: The Instrumentals (2005)
 Rapper's Best Friend (2007)
 Greneberg Instrumentals (2011)
 Covert Coup Instrumentals (2012)
 Rapper's Best Friend 2 (2012)
 360 Waves Instrumentals (2013)
 Lord Steppington Instrumental Version (2014)
 Rapper's Best Friend 3 (2014)
 Israeli Salad (2015)
 Retarded Alligator Beats (2015)
 The Silent Partner Instrumentals (2016)
 Rapper's Best Friend 4 (2017)
 French Blend (2017)
 French Blend Pt. 2 (2017)
 Paris x LA x Bruxelles (Instrumentals) (2017)
 Rapper's Best Friend 5 (2019)
 Fetti Instrumentals (2019)
 Yacht Rock 2 Instrumentals (2020)
 Alfredo Instrumentals (2020)
 A Doctor, Painter & An Alchemist Walk Into A Bar (2020)
 The Food Villain (2020)
 Man of Many Hats EP (2020)
 Carry the Fire (2021)
 Rapper's Best Friend 6 (2021)

Collaborations
 Make Way For The W (1993) (with Scott Caan as the Whooliganz; album never officially released but was bootlegged)
 Return of the Mac (2007) (with Prodigy)
 The Antidote (2009) (with Fashawn)
 Sawblade EP (2010) (with Oh No as Gangrene)
 Gutter Water (2010) (with Oh No as Gangrene)
 Covert Coup (2011) (with Curren$y)
 Greneberg (2011) (with Oh No as Gangrene and Roc Marciano)
 How Does It Feel EP (2011) (with ChrisCo)
 Vodka & Ayahuasca (2012) (with Oh No as Gangrene)
 Odditorium EP (2012) (with Oh No as Gangrene)
 No Idols (2012) (with Domo Genesis)
 Rare Chandeliers (2012) (with Action Bronson)
 360 Waves (2013) (with Durag Dynasty)
 Albert Einstein (2013) (with Prodigy)
 Masterpiece Theatre EP (2013) (with Willie the Kid)
 The Music of Grand Theft Auto V: The Score (2013) (with Tangerine Dream and Woody Jackson and Oh No)
 My 1st Chemistry Set (2013) (with Boldy James)
 Lord Steppington (2014) (with Evidence as Step Brothers)
 The Good Book (2014) (with Budgie)
 FASH-ionably Late (2014) (with Fashawn)
 Welcome to Los Santos (2015) (with Oh No)
 You Disgust Me (2015) (with Oh No as Gangrene)
 The Carrollton Heist (2016) (with Curren$y)
 Rap & Glorie (2016) (with Kempi)
 The Silent Partner (2016) (with Havoc)
 Fantasy Island EP (2017) (with Jay Worthy)
 The Good Book, Volume 2 (2017) (with Budgie)
 Paris, LA, Bruxelles (2017) (with Red Bull France)
 Moving Parts (2017) (with Lunice)
 Fetti (2018) (with Freddie Gibbs & Curren$y)
 Layups - EP (2019) (with The Cool Kids)
Burnt Tree (2019) (with Evidence as Step Brothers)
Lamb Over Rice (2019) (with Action Bronson)
Boldface EP (2019) (with Boldy James) 
The Price of Tea in China (2020) (with Boldy James)
LULU (2020) (with Conway the Machine)
Alfredo (2020) (with Freddie Gibbs)
Haram (2021) (with Armand Hammer)
Bo Jackson (2021) (with Boldy James)
Super Tecmo Bo (2021) (with Boldy James)
Continuance (2022) (with Curren$y)
The Elephant Man’s Bones (2022) (with Roc Marciano)
 One More (2022)  (with Mike, Wiki)
 The Great Escape (2023) (with Larry June)

References

External links 
 
 The Alchemist at MTV.com

1977 births
Living people
American hip hop record producers
American male rappers
American people of Israeli descent
American people of Romanian-Jewish descent
American hip hop DJs
Jewish American musicians
Jewish rappers
Musicians from Beverly Hills, California
Rappers from Los Angeles
Shady Records artists
West Coast hip hop musicians
Rappers from New York City
Jewish hip hop record producers
21st-century American rappers
Record producers from New York (state)
Record producers from California
21st-century American male musicians
 
21st-century American Jews